DWC may refer to:

 Al Maktoum International Airport, United Arab Emirates (IATA code)
 Daniel Webster College, a former college in Nashua, New Hampshire, US
 Darwin Core, biodiversity data standards
 Deep water culture, of hydroponics
 Diamond wire cutting
 Douglas World Cruiser, a 1923 aircraft
 Subarctic climate (Köppen classification)